Tibor Magyar (born 4 March 1947) is a Hungarian former cyclist. He competed in the individual road race and the team time trial events at the 1968 Summer Olympics.

References

External links
 

1947 births
Living people
Hungarian male cyclists
Olympic cyclists of Hungary
Cyclists at the 1968 Summer Olympics
Cyclists from Budapest